The tenth edition of the Strade Bianche road cycling race was held on 5 March 2016, in Tuscany, Italy. Swiss Fabian Cancellara concluded his third win in the race. The race covered , starting and finishing in Siena. It was part of the 2016 UCI Europe Tour, a 1.HC-ranked event.

Route  

The race started and finished in the UNESCO World Heritage Site of Siena, marking a shift from previous editions, which started in San Gimignano. Because of its new start location, the distance is scaled back to 176 kilometres, run entirely within the southern Tuscan province of Siena. The Strade Bianche is particularly renowned for its sectors of white gravel roads (strade bianche or sterrati), which comprise large sections of the route.

The course ran over the hilly terrain of the Chianti region and included nine sectors and a total of 52.8 km (32.8 mi) of dirt road. The first sector was addressed just 11 km after the start; the longest and most arduous sectors were the ones in Lucignano d’Asso (11.9 km) and Monte Sante Marie (11.5 km). The race finished on Siena's illustrious Piazza del Campo, after a narrow ascent on the roughly-paved Via Santa Caterina in the heart of the medieval city, with steep stretches of up to 16 % gradient.

Pre-race favourites 
Previous year's laureate, Czech Zdeněk Štybar, lined up for the 2016 event. World champion Peter Sagan, runner-up in 2013 and 2014, and twofold winner Fabian Cancellara expressed they targeted a victory in the Strade Bianche. Other riders among the favorites were Vincenzo Nibali, Alejandro Valverde, Michał Kwiatkowski and Greg Van Avermaet.

Participating teams 
18 teams took part in the race: twelve UCI WorldTeams and  six UCI Professional Continental teams – totaling 144 riders. Each team had a maximum of eight riders:

Results

See also 
2016 in men's road cycling

References

External links 

Strade Bianche
Strade Bianche
Strade Bianche